The Stone House, also known as the Walker-Stone House, is a historic house at 207 Center Street in Fayetteville, Arkansas.  It is a two-story brick building, with a side-gable roof, a two-story porch extending across the front, and an ell attached to the left.  The porch has particularly elaborate Victorian styling, with bracketed posts and a jigsawn balustrade on the second level.  The house was built in 1845, by Judge David Walker, and is one of a small number of Fayetteville properties to survive the American Civil War (although it was damaged by a shell).  It was owned for many years by the Stone family, and reacquired by a Stone descendant in the late 1960s with an eye toward its restoration.

The house was listed on the National Register of Historic Places in 1970.

See also
National Register of Historic Places listings in Washington County, Arkansas

References

Houses on the National Register of Historic Places in Arkansas
Houses completed in 1845
Houses in Fayetteville, Arkansas
National Register of Historic Places in Fayetteville, Arkansas